Jorge de Souza (born 20 July 1939), sometimes known as just Jorge, is a Brazilian footballer. He played in six matches for the Brazil national football team in 1963. He was also part of Brazil's squad for the 1963 South American Championship.

References

External links
 

1939 births
Living people
Brazilian footballers
Brazil international footballers
Association football defenders
Footballers from Rio de Janeiro (city)